The 2007 K League Championship was the eleventh competition of the K League Championship, and was held to decide the 25th champions of the K League. The top six clubs of the regular season qualified for the championship. The winners of the regular season directly qualified for the final, and second place team qualified for the semi-final. The other four clubs entered the first round, and the winners of the second round advanced to the semi-final. Each match was played as a single match, excluding the final which consisted of two matches.

Qualified teams

Bracket

First round

Gyeongnam vs Pohang

Ulsan vs Daejeon

Second round

Semi-final

Final

First leg

Second leg

Pohang Steelers won 4–1 on aggregate.

Final table

See also
2007 in South Korean football
2007 K League

External links
News at K League 
Match report at K League 

 

K League Championship
K